A Shot at Glory is the eighth soundtrack album by British singer-songwriter and guitarist Mark Knopfler, released on 28 April 2002 by Mercury Records. The album contains music composed for the 2001 film A Shot at Glory, directed by Michael Corrente.

Critical reception

In his review for AllMusic, William Ruhlmann gave the album three out of five stars, noting that Knopfler's soundtrack albums are so closely identified with him that "it's a dilemma where to shelve them in the record store." Ruhlmann continued:

Track listing
All music was written by Mark Knopfler, except where indicated.

Personnel
Music
 Mark Knopfler – guitars, bass
 Guy Fletcher – keyboards
 Billy Jackson – harp, bodhran, whistle
 Iain Lothian – piano accordion
 Steve Sidwell – flugelhorn
 Danny Cummings – percussion
 Iain MacInnes – bagpipes
 Chris White – tenor and soprano saxophone
 Catriona MacDonald – fiddle

Production
 Mark Knopfler – producer
 Guy Fletcher – producer

References

External links
 A Shot at Glory at Mark Knopfler official website
 

Mark Knopfler soundtracks
Albums produced by Mark Knopfler
Albums produced by Guy Fletcher
2002 soundtrack albums
Sports film soundtracks
Mercury Records soundtracks